Paul Alexander Schweitzer, S. J., (born 21 July 1937, Yonkers, New York) is an American mathematician, specializing in differential topology, geometric topology, and algebraic topology.

He has done research on foliations, knot theory, and 3-manifolds. In 1974 he found a counterexample to the Seifert conjecture that every non-vanishing vector field on the 3-sphere has a closed integral curve. In 1995 he demonstrated that Sergei Novikov's compact leaf theorem cannot be generalized to manifolds with dimension greater than 3. Specifically, Schweitzer proved that a smooth, compact, connected manifold with Euler characteristic zero and dimension > 3 has a C1 codimension-one foliation that has no compact leaf.

Education and career
Schweitzer studied at the College of the Holy Cross in Worcester, Massachusetts with M.A. in 1958 and then received his Ph.D. in 1962 at Princeton University under Norman Steenrod with thesis Secondary cohomology operations induced by the diagonal mapping. He received a degree in philosophy (Phil. L.) in 1966 from Weston College in Weston, Massachusetts and a bachelor's degree in 1970 in theology (B. Div.) from the Weston Jesuit School of Theology in Cambridge, Massachusetts and was ordained in 1970 as a Catholic priest. In 1963 he became a member of the Jesuits. He became in 1971 a professor extraordinarius and in 1980 a professor ordinarius at the Pontifical Catholic University of Rio de Janeiro.

Schweitzer has been a visiting professor at the University of Notre Dame, the Fairfield University, Northwestern University, Boston College, Harvard University, and the University of Strasbourg. For the academic years 1970–1971 and 1981–1982 he was at the Institute for Advanced Study.

Since 1978 he has been on the board of the Brazilian Mathematical Society.

He was elected a Fellow of the American Mathematical Society in 2012. He was an Invited Speaker at the ICM in 1974 in Vancouver.

References

External links
Paul A. Schweitzer, S.J., Full Professor, Dept. of Mathematics, PUC-Rio

1937 births
20th-century American mathematicians
21st-century American mathematicians
20th-century American Jesuits
21st-century American Jesuits
Topologists
College of the Holy Cross alumni
Princeton University alumni
Boston College School of Theology and Ministry alumni
Academic staff of the Pontifical Catholic University of Rio de Janeiro
Fellows of the American Mathematical Society
Living people
People from Yonkers, New York
Mathematicians from New York (state)